Business/IT Fusion: How to Move Beyond Alignment and Transform IT in Your Organization is a business book by Peter Hinssen, published in 2009. It discusses an approach to IT management different to the classic model of business/IT alignment. In place of alignment focused on the collaboration between business and IT, Hinssen suggests that the future evolution in IT lies in the convergence of the two parties: integrating IT into the business rather than treating it as a supplier. The work is presented as a guidebook to "IT 2.0".

References

External links 
 

Business books